The  is a two-car tilting diesel multiple unit (DMU) train type operated by Shikoku Railway Company (JR Shikoku) in Japan since August 2017 on limited express services in Shikoku.

Design
The trains are built by Kawasaki Heavy Industries to a "Neo Japonisme" concept, combining traditional Japanese craftsmanship with modern styling.

The trains use the same pneumatic tilt system as the 8600 series EMU trains (instead of the pendulum system used in the older 2000 series trains) to allow faster speeds on curves. The train features a database of curves along the line, allowing the train to begin tilting before reaching the curve.

Operations
The 2600 series trains are used on the Yosan Line, Dosan Line, and Kōtoku Line from December 2017, replacing the ageing 2000 series DMU trains.

Formation
The trains are formed as two-car sets, with both cars powered (one axle per bogie).

Interior
Passenger accommodation consists of ordinary-class 2+2 abreast reclining seats, with the same seat design as used on the 8600 series EMU trains. Each seat is provided with an AC power outlet. The Mc car has maroon colour seat covers, while the Mc' car has dark blue seat covers. The Mc' car has a toilet, while the Mc car includes a wheelchair space and universal access toilet. LED lighting is used throughout.

History
Details of the new trains were officially announced on 30 January 2017. The first two trainsets were delivered from the Kawasaki Heavy Industries factory in Kobe to Takamatsu Depot in February 2017.

From 12 to 15 August 2017, the two sets were also used on additional seasonal Awadori limited express services operating between Takamatsu and Tokushima.

Future developments
In September 2017, JR Shikoku announced that the pneumatic tilting system used on the trains did not operate effectively, and future trains built based on the 2600 series design would use a pendular tilting system instead. This led to the development of the 2700 series, which was first announced in 2018, and entered revenue service on 6 August 2019.

References

External links

Official website (archived on March 30, 2019)

2600 series
2600 series
Tilting trains
Train-related introductions in 2017
Kawasaki multiple units